Jonathan Elliott is an American composer and teacher. Born in 1962, Elliott grew up in Bucks County, Pennsylvania, studying piano from the age of six. He went on to study composition at Vassar College, where his teachers included Annea Lockwood and the pianist Todd Crow; Elliott subsequently received his PhD from the University of Chicago, where he studied with Ralph Shapey and Shulamit Ran. He received two Broadcast Music, Inc. Student Composer awards in 1985 and 1987.

Elliott is currently composer in residence at Saint Ann's School, in Brooklyn, New York, where he has taught since 1988. He previously taught at Chicago, Vassar, and Bard College. He has received fellowships from Yaddo, the American Composers Forum, and the MacDowell Colony (1989, 1990), and has been in residence at institutions such as the University of Florida.

Elliott's compositions have been performed at venues and institutions such as the Aspen Music Festival, Columbia University, Temple University, the World Saxophone Congress, UC Davis, Shanghai Conservatory of Music, the Sydney Conservatorium of Music, the University of Hartford Hartt School, Penn State Hazleton, Symphony Space, University of the Witwatersrand, Montclair State University, Bridgewater State University, Museum of Art, Seoul National University, the Sydney Conservatorium of Music, the University of Illinois at Urbana–Champaign, and the University of St Andrews.

Selected works

Orchestral 

 In Silence (1989)
 Tableaux  (1991)

Chamber 

Peacock Fantasia (2018) – flute, viola, piano
Quartet for Saxophones (2010)
 Then (2009)
 Hommage a B.B. (1997)
 Field Music: Spiral (1997)

Instrumental duo 

River (2014) – alto saxophone and cello
Szellem (2012) – alto saxophone and guitar
Five (2010) – flute and piano
Field Music Ash (2005) – alto saxophone and cello 
Friss (2001) – flute and cello
Odd Preludes (2000) – alto saxophone and piano

References

External links 
 

1962 births
Living people
Vassar College alumni
University of Chicago alumni
21st-century classical composers
20th-century classical composers
21st-century American composers
20th-century American composers
American male classical composers
American classical composers
Musicians from Philadelphia
Classical musicians from Pennsylvania
20th-century American male musicians
21st-century American male musicians